The Cruiser Tank Mk IV (A13 Mk II) was a British cruiser tank of the Second World War. It followed directly on from the Tank, Cruiser, Mk III (A13 Mk I). The first Mk IVs were Mk IIIs with extra armour fitted to the turret. Later Mk IVAs were built with the complete extra armour. The tank was used in France in 1940 and in the early part of the war in North Africa, before being withdrawn from service. A fast vehicle compared to other British tanks of the early part of the war, it was probably the best tank Britain had in 1940. In total, 955 of these tanks were built.

Design and development
Britain became interested in fast tanks after observing the Soviet BT tanks during the 1936 Red Army manoeuvres. The BT was based on the revolutionary designs of American J. Walter Christie and a team from Morris Motors was sent to the United States to purchase a Christie tank and the rights to build more. The tank was given the General Staff designation "A13E1" and was delivered in late 1936, but the hull was too small and this led to a second British-built prototype.

The A13E2 was built to mount the turret of the Vickers designed Cruiser Tank MkI (A9). This carried a 40 mm Ordnance QF 2-pounder gun and a co-axial .303 water-cooled Vickers machine gun. The drive train was also revised, with the ability to run on its road wheels as a wheeled vehicle.

The A13E3 was the final trials model, which led to the production tank, A13 MkI, Cruiser Tank Mk III, which entered production in 1939 at Nuffield Mechanization & Aero Limited, a munitions subsidiary within the Nuffield Organization. An order for 65 tanks was placed and at least 30 tanks completed when the War Office decided to build a new model with thicker armour. This gave the tank a far more modern appearance; some Mk III tanks were re-built to Mk IV standard while at the factory.

The .303 Vickers machine gun gave constant trouble and was replaced by the 7.92 mm BESA machine gun. All British tanks were to have their designs modified to mount the new weapon from early 1940. This led to the main production version, the A13 MkIIA, Cruiser Tank MkIVA. A few examples were sent with the BEF to France, along with most of the earlier A13s. It is not known how many A13 MkIVA tanks were built - the numbers depending on the source. Between the Cruiser Mark III and Cruiser Mark IV, 665 had been built when production ended in 1941. English Electric, Leyland and LMS Railway were also involved in A13 production.

During the Battle of France, the A13 did not perform well, due to poor crew training as a result of its being rushed into service. Many tanks shipped to France were in poor condition and some were so new that they had vital parts missing. The A13 performed much better in the deserts of North Africa and coped with the conditions better than some other designs. It was fast, adequately armed and armoured against Italian and German tanks. It remained an effective weapon until late 1941, when newer models of the Panzer III and Panzer IV appeared with thicker armour and larger guns. In North Africa, it was the anti-tank gun that claimed the vast majority of British tanks lost in battle; German tanks accounted for few British losses, contrary to popular belief.

The Cruiser MkIV was replaced by two tank designs, the Cruiser MkV Covenanter tank and the A15 Crusader tank. The A13 Covenanter was a radical departure from the original A13 design and constituted an entirely new tank, though glaring design flaws meant it was unsuitable for warfare and only used for training. The A15 Crusader used the same Liberty engine but in all other respects was a new design.

Production history

 65 MkIII, built 1939 by Nuffield (some converted to MkIV)
 225–665 MkIV and MkIVA, built 1939–41 by Nuffield, Leyland, English Electric and LMS.
 MkIV CS, not built
 MkV, re-design by LMS Railway as A13, Cruiser Tank MkV Covenanter

Variants
Mk IVA / AC Mk IIA
.303 Vickers machine gun replaced with  Besa machine gun. The MkIVA featured a new gun mantlet and was built at several factories, including LMS Railway. It was the main type used in the desert from 1940 to 1942.

Combat history
Approximately 40 Cruiser Mk IV and MkIVA, saw service in France in 1940 with the 1st Armoured Division of the British Expeditionary Force. Most were abandoned at Calais, and the few tanks that did see action were destroyed by the numerically superior German armoured forces.

From October 1940, MkIVA cruisers were sent to the war in North Africa, where it was used with the older A9, Cruiser Tank MkI and A10 Cruiser Tank MkII. The A13 was never available in sufficient numbers and a typical armoured brigade would have a mixture of relatively slow  Mk I and Mk II cruisers with faster  Mark IVs and Light Tank Mk VI (the latter acting as cruiser tanks), this caused tactical and supply difficulties.

Nine Mark IV tanks captured by the Germans after the Battle of France were reused as command vehicles for Panzer Abteilung (Flamm) 100 ("Flame tank battalion 100") during Operation Barbarossa. They were given the German designations Pz.Kpf.Wg.A13(e) or MK IV 744(e); the 'e' signifying their origin as 'English'.

References

External links

 HenkofHolland
 OnWar.com
 WWIIvehicles.com

Cruiser tanks of the United Kingdom
World War II tanks of the United Kingdom
Military vehicles introduced from 1940 to 1944